Modulidae, common name modulids, is a family of small sea snails, marine gastropod molluscs in the superfamily Cerithioidea.

According to the taxonomy of the Gastropoda by Bouchet & Rocroi (2005) the family Modulidae has no subfamilies.

Genera
Genera within the family Modulidae include:
Conomodulus Landau, Vermeij & Reich, 2014
 † Incisilabium Cossmann, 1918
Indomodulus Landau, Vermeij & Reich, 2014
† Laevimodulus Landau, Vermeij & Reich, 2014
† Modulostylina Bandel, 2006 - with the only species Modulostylina waageni Kittl, 1884 - from Late Triassic
Modulus Gray, 1840 - the type genus of the family Modulidae
 † Psammodulus Collins, 1934 
Trochomodulus Landau, Vermeij & Reich, 2014
Synonyms
Aplodon Rafinesque, 1819: synonym of Modulus Gray, 1842 (senior synonym of Modulus which, however, is in prevailing usage)

References 

 Landau B., Vermeij G. K. & Reich S. (2014). Classification of the Modulidae (Caenogastropoda, Cerithioidea), with new genera and new fossil species from the Neogene of tropical America and Indonesia. Basteria. 78(1-3): 1-29.

External links 
 Fischer, P. (1880-1887). Manuel de conchyliologie et de paléontologie conchyliologique, ou histoire naturelle des mollusques vivants et fossiles suivi d'un Appendice sur les Brachiopodes par D. P. Oehlert. Avec 23 planches contenant 600 figures dessinées par S. P. Woodward.. Paris: F. Savy. Published in 11 parts